James L. Nelson (born 1962) is an American historical nautical novelist.

Early life

Nelson was born in Lewiston, Maine in 1962. He expressed an interest in boats from a young age, building a skipjack in ninth grade and a canoe in eleventh. In 1980, Nelson graduated from Lewiston High School. He attended the University of Massachusetts Amherst, Amherst, Massachusetts for two years, and then transferred to UCLA, with the ambition of becoming a film director. After living in Marina del Rey, Los Angeles, Nelson found work aboard the Golden Hinde, where he met future wife Lisa Page. In 1992, Nelson completed his first novel, By Force of Arms. He and Lisa were married the next year. Nelson currently lives in Harpswell, Maine, with Lisa and their four children, Elizabeth, Nathaniel, Jonathan, and Abigail. Nelson continues to write full-time, and has published over twenty-five books, both fiction and nonfiction.

Awards
Nelson received the W.Y. Boyd Literary Award for Excellence in Military Fiction from the American Library Association in 2004 for his novel, Glory In The Name: A Novel of the Confederate Navy.

He won the 2009 Samuel Eliot Morison Award for Naval Literature for George Washington's Secret Navy.

Bibliography

Novels
 Revolution at Sea Saga series
 By Force of Arms (1997), 
 The Maddest Idea (1997), 
 The Continental Risque (1998), 
 Lords of the Ocean (1999), 
 All the Brave Fellows (2001), 

 Brethren of the Coast
 The Guardship (2000), . Spanish edition published by Ediciones B as "El vigía" in 2004.
 The Blackbirder (2001), . Spanish edition published by Ediciones B as "El negrero" in 2005.
 The Pirate Round (2002), . Spanish edition published by Ediciones B as "La ronda del pirata" in 2007.

Civil War at Sea series
 Glory in the Name (2004), 
 Thieves of Mercy (2005), 

The Norsemen Saga
 Fin Gall  (2013) 
 Dubh-Linn  (2014) 
 The Lord of Vik-lo (2015) 
 Glendalough Fair (2015) 
 Night Wolf (2016) 
 Raider's Wake (2017) 
 Loch Garman (2017) 
 A Vengeful Wind (2018)

Standalone novels
 The Only Life that Mattered: The Short and Merry Lives of Anne Bonny, Mary Read, and Calico Jack (2004) 
 The French Prize (2015) 
 Full Fathom Five (2016)

Non-fiction
 Reign of Iron: The Story of the First Battling Ironclads, the Monitor and the Merrimack (2004) 
 Benedict Arnold's Navy: the Ragtag Fleet that Lost the Battle of Lake Champlain But Won the American Revolution (2006),  
 George Washington's Secret Navy: How the American Revolution Went to Sea (2008),  
 George Washington's Great Gamble: And the Sea Battle That Won the American Revolution (2010), 
 With Fire and Sword: The Battle of Bunker Hill and the Beginning of the Revolution'' (2011)

References

External links
 James L. Nelson Official site
 Bibliography at Fantastic Fiction
 Interview at the Pritzker Military Museum & Library recorded on March 14, 2009

1962 births
American historical novelists
American military writers
Nautical historical novelists
Living people
People from Lewiston, Maine
University of Massachusetts Amherst alumni
Novelists from Maine
People from Harpswell, Maine
University of California, Los Angeles alumni
Maritime writers
American male novelists
American male non-fiction writers
Lewiston High School (Maine) alumni